The Col du Perthus or Col du Pertus is a mountain pass ascending to an altitude of  in the Mounts of Cantal and in the department of the same name, in the Massif Central.

It was used in the 2011 Tour de France during Stage 9. It was classified as a Category 2 climb with Johnny Hoogerland being the first to summit. It was used again by the Tour de France on 6 July 2016 during the Stage 5 of the 2016 Tour. It was then also classified as a Category 2 climb and with Greg Van Avermaet being the first to summit.

References

Landforms of Cantal
Transport in Auvergne-Rhône-Alpes
Mountain passes of Auvergne-Rhône-Alpes
Mountain passes of the Massif Central